Wheel 2000 (also known as Wheel of Fortune 2000) is a children's version of the American game show Wheel of Fortune, produced by Scott Sternberg Productions and Columbia TriStar Television (and the last version of Wheel of any sort to air on daytime network television). The show was created by Scott Sternberg and was hosted by David Sidoni, with Tanika Ray providing voice work and motion capture for a virtual reality hostess named "Cyber Lucy".

The show premiered on September 13, 1997, on CBS, aired as part of the network's attempt to meet the then-new E/I mandates during its Saturday morning block, and ran through February 7, 1998 with repeats continuing through September 26. Game Show Network broadcast Wheel 2000s episodes concurrently with their airings on CBS. It was taped at Sony Pictures Studios.

Gameplay

The gameplay of Wheel 2000 was very similar to that of Wheel of Fortune, except children aged 10–15 competed for points and prizes instead of cash with the eventual winner playing for a grand prize in the bonus round. Round categories were chosen by the contestants from a possible three; the names of the categories were updated to reflect the younger contestants ("Place", for example, became "Globetrotter"). New categories replaced those chosen in each round. In Round 1, the coin toss winner/the red contestant would choose, Round 2, the yellow contestant, Round 3, the blue contestant and so on.
The first contestant to solve the puzzle got to keep all the points he/she earned in that round and won a prize; if the player who solved the puzzle scored 200 or less, however, his/her score got bumped up to 500 points. At the end of each round, hostess Lucy or a celebrity talked about the solved puzzle or something associated to it.

On a Speed-Up Round; if time has run out in the middle of a round, a factory whistle would sound and the game shifted into a Speed-Up round, which was played the same way as the grown-up show. The host David will start off by giving the wheel a final spin, then he will ask the contestants to call a letter and he/she got five seconds to solve the puzzle. Vowels are worth nothing and consonants are worth a number of points landed on. The eventual top winner advancing to the Bonus Round.

In case of a tie for first place that happens after the speed-up round, a tie-breaking puzzle (also known as a second speed-up round) will be in play between the tied contestants which will decide the winner. The first contestant who solves the tie-breaking puzzle wins and advances to the bonus round. Presumably, due to the game being played for points, the Wheel is not spun and consonants are worth 5,000 points. After each round, Cyber Lucy (or a celebrity; most featured were the child actors on The Nanny, a fellow Columbia-TriStar produced series also airing on CBS) presented a short video clip related to the solved puzzle. Vowels cost 250 points. Games were typically played to three rounds, with top point values of 1,000 for Round 1, 2,000 for Round 2, and 5,000 for Round 3.

The wheel featured a special wedge on which a contestant could choose to play a pre-determined stunt to earn up to three extra letters (first round only; the spaces were otherwise giant 250-point spaces). There was also a "WWW.WHEEL2000.COM" wedge, which allowed a home viewer who had previously registered on the site to win Wheel 2000 merchandise if a contestant hit the wedge and called a consonant that appeared in the puzzle. The Lose a Turn wedge was named the "Loser" spot which Sidoni & Lucy simply gives the player "The Big 'L'" with their arms or hands and need to skip his/her turn. In place of the Bankrupt wedge was "The Creature", which, if the contestant landed on that wedge, would prompt the wheel to rise, belch smoke, and cause an unseen creature to "eat" the contestant's points. If the player hit that space with no points, the player got 'eaten' instead until their next turn. Other special wedges included Double Up, which awarded double its value per letter if a contestant correctly answered a trivia question, and a Prize Box, which functioned identically to the special prize wedges on the adult version, except contestants were allowed to keep the prize whether they solved the puzzle or not and the value was not added to their score.

Cyber Lucy would tell the contestants whether or not letters were in the puzzle instead of Sidoni, and whether or not they solved the puzzle.
The bonus round was played almost identically to the adult version, including the adult categories, except that prizes were determined by selecting from two envelopes labeled "A" or "B" instead of the five choices in the adult version at the time.  Unlike the adult version, the prize was not revealed if the bonus round puzzle was not solved.

13-city tour
In early 1998, Wheel 2000 made a 13-city tour, appearing in shopping malls around the country. The Discover-branded tour, coordinated by the Chicago office of New Jersey-based promotion agency DVC Group, also featured Sidoni as host, with Ray as Lucy joining him again. The tour visited a variety of major market cities: Chicago, Philadelphia, Pittsburgh, Washington, D.C., New York City, Charlotte, Dallas, Denver, Salt Lake City, Seattle, Indianapolis, San Jose, and Anaheim. Winners from each market were invited to appear as contestants on the program in a grand finale.

International versions

External links

References

1997 American television series debuts
1998 American television series endings
1990s American children's game shows
American children's education television series
American television spin-offs
CBS original programming
Television series by Sony Pictures Television
Wheel of Fortune (franchise)
English-language television shows
Roulette and wheel games
Culver City, California
Television series about children
Television series about teenagers
Television shows filmed in California